East Malling  is a civil parish in Kent which includes the villages of East Malling and Larkfield.

History 
The parish was renamed from "East Malling" on 19 April 1962.

References

Civil parishes in Kent
Tonbridge and Malling